Yuji Nashiro (名城裕司) (born September 13, 1983) is a Japanese kickboxer who competes in the welterweight division.

Biography and career
Nashiro was born in Nara City and is the brother of world champion boxer Nobuo Nashiro. He began his martial arts career in Kyokushin karate, in which he was the Japanese and Asian champion in the middleweight division. He was also the amateur Muay Thai champion of Japan.

He made his professional kickboxing debut in 2006 and won his first three fights by knockout before taking a break from the sport for almost three years. He returned at the K-1 World MAX 2010 -70kg Japan Tournament where he was knocked out by Yuichiro Nagashima in the quarter-finals. Following this, he went on to compete in the Krush promotion where he won his first two fights before losing to Yoshihiro Sato.

He returned to the Japan MAX Tournament at K-1 World MAX 2011 -70kg Japan Tournament Final where he caused an upset by winning the tournament. He defeated 2002 World MAX champion Albert Kraus in the quarter-finals and Takafumi Morita in the semis, both by decision, before going on to knock out Yuya Yamamoto in the first round of the final.

On February 25, 2012, he defeated Yukihiko Komiya via majority decision at Big Bang 8 in Tokyo.

Nashiro moved down in weight to compete in the Krush Grand Prix 2013 ~67kg First Class Tournament~ on January 14, 2012, facing Abdallah Ezbiri at the quarter-finals. He came in overweight on his first two attempts and lost by unanimous decision.

He challenged Danilo Zanolini for his HEAT Middleweight (-70 kg/154 lb) Championship at HEAT 27 in Kobe, Japan on July 28, 2013, losing by unanimous decision.

Titles
 All Japan Kyokushin Open Middle Weight Class Knockdown Karate Champion 2002 
 Middle Asian Kyokushin Middle Weight Class Knockdown Karate Champion 2003 
 K-2 Gloved Karate Kansai Tournament Champion 2006 
 All Japan Glove Karate Competition Champion 2006 
 WMFJ Japanese Amateur Muay Thai Champion
 All Japan Glove Karate Tournament Champion
2011 K-1 -70kg Japan Tournament Champion

Kickboxing record

|-
|
|Loss
| Danilo Zanolini
|HEAT 27
|Kobe, Japan
|Decision (unanimous)
|align="center"|3
|align="center"|3:00
|10-6
|For the HEAT Middleweight (-70 kg) Championship.
|-
|
|Loss
| Abdellah Ezbiri
|Krush Grand Prix 2013 ~67 kg Tournament First Round~
|Tokyo, Japan
|Decision (unanimous)
|align="center"|3
|align="center"|3:00
|10-5
|Quarter-finals.
|-
|
|Loss
| Reece McAllister
|K-1 World MAX 2012 World Championship Tournament Final 16
|Madrid, Spain
|Decision (unanimous)
|align="center"|3
|align="center"|3:00
|10-4
|First round.
|-
|
|Win
| Yukihiko Komiya
|Big Bang 8
|Tokyo, Japan
|Decision (majority)
|align="center"|3
|align="center"|3:00
|10-3
| 
|-
|
|Win
| Yuya Yamamoto
|K-1 World MAX 2011 -70kg Japan Tournament Final
|Osaka, Japan
|KO (punches)
|align="center"|1
|align="center"|3:00
|9-3
|2011 Japan MAX Tournament final.
|-
|
|Win
| Takafumi Morita
|K-1 World MAX 2011 -70kg Japan Tournament Final
|Osaka, Japan
|Decision (unanimous)
|align="center"|3
|align="center"|3:00
|8-3
|2011 Japan MAX Tournament semi-final.
|-
|
|Win
| Albert Kraus
|K-1 World MAX 2011 -70kg Japan Tournament Final
|Osaka, Japan
|Decision (unanimous)
|align="center"|3
|align="center"|3:00
|7-3
|2011 Japan MAX Tournament quarter-final.
|-
|
|Loss
| Kosuke Yamauchi
|Krush Championship Tournament: Round 1
|Japan
|Decision
|align="center"|3
|align="center"|3:00
|6-3
| 
|-
|
|Win
| Daisuke Tsutsumi
|Krush Championship Tournament: Round 2
|Japan
|Decision
|align="center"|3
|align="center"|3:00
|6-2
| 
|-
|
|Loss
| Yoshihiro Sato
|Krush.9
|Tokyo, Japan
|Decision (unanimous)
|align="center"|3
|align="center"|3:00
|5-2
| 
|-
|
|Win
| Kenta
|Krush.8
|Japan
|Decision
|align="center"|3
|align="center"|3:00
|5-1
| 
|-
|
|Win
| Hiroshi Yamauchi
|Krush.7
|Japan
|KO (left high kick)
|align="center"|1
|align="center"|1:57
|4-1
| 
|-
|
|Loss
| Yuichiro Nagashima
|K-1 World MAX 2010 –70 kg Japan Tournament
|Saitama, Japan
|KO (left hook)
|align="center"|1
|align="center"|0:39
|3-1
|2010 Japan MAX Tournament quarter-final.
|-
|
|Win
| Hakuto
|K-1 World MAX 2007 World Tournament Final Elimination
|Tokyo, Japan
|TKO (three knockdowns)
|align="center"|2
|align="center"|2:46
|3-0
| 
|-
|
|Win
| Teppei Yasuda
|K-1 World MAX 2007 World Elite Showcase
|Yokohama, Japan
|KO (left knee)
|align="center"|1
|align="center"|2:12
|2-0
| 
|-
|
|Win
| Phil Leier
|H2H Shockwave
|Calgary, Alberta, Canada
|KO (right hook)
|align="center"|3
|align="center"|-
|1-0
| 
|-
|-
| colspan=10 | Legend:

References

External links
 K-1 Profile

1983 births
Living people
Japanese male kickboxers
Welterweight kickboxers
Japanese male karateka
Kyokushin kaikan practitioners
People from Nara, Nara